Abu Shukheidim was a Palestinian village in the Ramallah and al-Bireh Governorate. 

In 2005 it merged with  the village of Al-Mazra'a al-Qibliya  to form the town of Al-Zaitounah.

History
Pottery sherds from the Hellenistic/Roman, Byzantine, Crusader/Ayyubid  and the Mamluk eras have been found here.

Ottoman era
Sherds from the early Ottoman era has also been found here.

In 1838, it was noted as a Muslim village, Abu Shukheidim, in the Bani Harith district, north of Jerusalem.

In 1863 Victor Guérin found it consisting of a dozen houses. A birket (artificial pond) was lined on the inside with good cement, but needed repairs. Near the birket were several very old buildings. The villagers were compelled to stock up on water at a well located at the bottom of the mountain whose village occupies the summit.

An Ottoman village list of about 1870 showed that Abu Schechedim  had 14 houses and a population of 76, though the population count included men, only.

In 1882, the PEF's Survey of Western Palestine described Abu Shukheidim as a village resembling Abu Qash, and supplied by the same  well.

In 1896 the population of  'Abu schechedim was estimated to be about 204 persons.

British Mandate era
In the 1922 census of Palestine, conducted by the British Mandate authorities, the population of Abu Iskhajdam was 139 Muslims, increasing in the  1931 census  to  201 Muslims, in 47 houses.

In 1945 statistics  Abu Shukheidim had a population of 250 Muslims,  and a total land area of 1,430  dunams.

Jordanian era
In the wake of the 1948 Arab–Israeli War, and after the 1949 Armistice Agreements, Abu Shukheidim  came  under Jordanian rule.  

The Jordanian census of 1961 found 1,358 inhabitants.

Post-1967
Since the Six-Day War in 1967,  Abu Shukheidim  has been under Israeli occupation. 

After the 1995 accords, 54.2% of Al-Zaitounah land was defined as Area B, while the remaining 45.8% was defined as Area C. Israel has confiscated 308 dunams of land from Al-Zaitounah in order to construct two Israeli settlements, Talmon and Nahl'iel.

References

Bibliography

External links
 Welcome to Abu Shukheidim
Survey of Western Palestine, Map 14:  IAA, Wikimedia commons 
 AL-Zaytouneh town (fact sheet),   Applied Research Institute–Jerusalem (ARIJ)
 AL-Zaytouneh town profile, (ARIJ)
AL-Zaytouneh  aerial photo, (ARIJ)
Locality Development Priorities and Needs in AL- Zaytouneh Town, (ARIJ)

Villages in the West Bank
Ramallah and al-Bireh Governorate
Municipalities of the State of Palestine